Mark Potts (born October 22, 1984, Taos, New Mexico) is a Pulitzer Prize winning journalist and filmmaker. He was part of the news team covering the 2015 San Bernardino attack for the Los Angeles Times which earned him a Pulitzer Prize for Breaking News Reporting in 2016. He grew up in Enid, Oklahoma and graduated Enid High School and the University of Oklahoma. His films include Simmons on Vinyl, The Stanton Family Grave Robbery, S&M Lawncare, and Cinema Six, the latter of which had a cameo by Bill Hader.

References

1984 births
Living people
American male journalists
Pulitzer Prize for Breaking News Reporting winners
Writers from Taos, New Mexico
Writers from Los Angeles
Enid High School alumni
University of Oklahoma alumni
Filmmakers from Enid, Oklahoma
Writers from Enid, Oklahoma